Markus Kilsgaard (born 23 February 1992 in Herning) is a former alpine skier and road racing cyclist from Denmark.  He competed for Denmark at the 2010 Winter Olympics.

Alpine skiing career

Olympic results

Cycling career
After the 2011 Junior World Championships ended his skiing career, and choose the road bicycle racing. He signing the Team Netcompany - Cycling Culture, and participated 2012 Danish National Time Trial Championships where he finished 12th place. He selected two times the member of Team Post Danmark and competed the Danmark Rundt in (2012 and 2013).

References

External links
 
 
 
 

1992 births
Living people
People from Herning Municipality
Danish male alpine skiers
Olympic alpine skiers of Denmark
Alpine skiers at the 2010 Winter Olympics
Sportspeople from the Central Denmark Region